Ecuadorian rice rat or Ecuadorian oryzomys (in various spellings) can refer to two species of rice rats:
Nephelomys auriventer, Golden-bellied oryzomys
Oreoryzomys balneator, Peruvian rice rat or Ecuadoran oryzomys

Animal common name disambiguation pages